Ammuta may refer to several places in Estonia:

Ammuta, Järva County, village in Kareda Parish, Järva County
Ammuta, Lääne County, village in Ridala Parish, Lääne County